Linda K. Menard (born December 21, 1943) is a former Republican member of the Alaska Senate. She represented the G District from 2009 through 2012.  She had previously served for over a decade on the Matanuska-Susitna Borough school board, including as president.

Her husband, Curtis D. Menard (1944–2009), himself had served in the Senate from 1991 to 1993, as well as serving three terms in the Alaska House of Representatives.  Curt Menard was serving as mayor of the Matanuska-Susitna Borough at the time of his death.  The Curtis D. Menard Memorial Sports Center in Wasilla would later be named in his honor.

Menard was initially known at the beginning of her tenure in the Senate, to some degree of scorn, for her efforts in establishing Marmot Day in Alaska, a cause originally championed by Curt Menard. Following the successful passage of the legislation in April 2009, she has focused most of her efforts on support for and work on constructing the Knik Arm Crossing bridge project.

On August 28, 2012, Menard lost her election bid in the Republican primary to Mike Dunleavy.

References

External links
 Alaska State Legislature - Senator Linda Menard official government website
 Project Vote Smart - Senator Linda K. Menard (AK) profile
 Follow the Money - Linda K. Menard
 2008 campaign contributions
 Linda Menard at 100 Years of Alaska's Legislature

1943 births
Republican Party Alaska state senators
Living people
People from Cheboygan, Michigan
People from Wasilla, Alaska
University of Alaska Fairbanks alumni
Women state legislators in Alaska
21st-century American politicians
21st-century American women politicians